Richard Lea Dickey (October 26, 1926 – July 3, 2006) was an American professional basketball player for the National Professional Basketball League's Anderson Packers and National Basketball Association's Boston Celtics, although he is best remembered for his college career while playing at NC State.

Early life
Dickey was born in Rigdon, Indiana. He attended Pendleton High School in Pendleton, Indiana and graduated in 1944. During his senior year of his high school basketball career, of which he started for three years, Dickey earned All-Sectional honors while playing for coach Art Gross.

Career

College
Dickey decided to attend North Carolina State University to play basketball for future Hall of Fame coach Everett Case two years after he graduated high school. It is his college career for which Dickey is most remembered. Between 1946–47 and 1949–50, the  forward (who would later play guard professionally) led the Wolfpack to all four Southern Conference championships during his tenure and was named all-conference four times. He is the only NC State player to earn that distinction. The Wolfpack compiled an overall record of 106–23 in that time, finishing with season records of 26–5, 28–4, 25–8 and 27–6. As a sophomore in 1947–48, Dickey was voted a consensus Second Team All-American.

In 1949–50, Dickey's senior season, the Wolfpack advanced to the NCAA Tournament Final Four, where they lost to eventual national champion CCNY, 78–73. When the Wolfpack defeated Holy Cross in the quarterfinals, Dickey cut down the rim's net, which was an Indiana high school basketball tradition that he is credited with introducing to the college game. He was also selected to play in the East-West College All-Star game at the end of the year.

Professional
After graduating in 1950, Dickey was selected as the 25th pick in the third round by the Baltimore Bullets in the 1950 NBA Draft. Although he was drafted by an NBA team, he actually spent his first year of professional basketball, 1950–51, playing for the Anderson Packers in the National Professional Basketball League, which existed independently for only that season. In , Dickey played for the Boston Celtics of the NBA and finished with 127 points, 81 rebounds and 50 assists. Dickey would be let go at the end of the season and never played professionally again.

NBA career statistics

Regular season

Playoffs

Later life
After his basketball playing career ended, Dickey spent much of his later life in the insurance industry, spending 29 years with Farm Bureau Insurance. He received a handful of belated honors for his basketball efforts at NC State and in the high school level, including a 2005 induction into the Indiana Basketball Hall of Fame and having his college jersey number (#70) officially honored by NC State. Dickey died on July 3, 2006, in Indianapolis at age 79. The cause of death was due to complications from recent lung surgery. He was survived by his wife, Jean, and his seven children.

References

External links
Dick Dickey's entry at the Indiana Basketball Hall of Fame

1926 births
2006 deaths

All-American college men's basketball players
American men's basketball players
Baltimore Bullets (1944–1954) draft picks
Basketball players from Indiana
Boston Celtics players
Forwards (basketball)
Guards (basketball)
NC State Wolfpack men's basketball players
People from Grant County, Indiana
People from Pendleton, Indiana